Kabwe District is a district of Zambia, located in Central Province. The capital lies at Kabwe. As of the 2010 Zambian Census, the district had a population of 195,979 people. It consists of two constituencies, namely Kabwe Central and Bwacha.

References

Districts of Central Province, Zambia
Kabwe